is an independent Japanese professional wrestling promotion. The promotion was founded by and is owned by puroresu legend Genichiro Tenryu, who has owned and operated it since its creation in 2010. The Tenryu project is the successor to Tenryu's WAR promotion that ran from 1992 until 2000 as well as Tenryu's Super World of Sports (SWS) that existed from 1990 until 1992. The Tenryu project have very few wrestlers under full-time contract and acts as a booking office for those under contract. For their shows they work with other Japanese wrestling promotions or hire freelance wrestlers to compete. After Tenryu's in-ring retirement match, Tenryu Project stopped running shows. After 5 years since Tenryu's retirement, a special Anniversary show was held in 2020 titled "Kakumei Densho". Tenryu Project was re-esthablished with a tour in 2021 titled "Survive the Revolution".

Roster

Notable guests/alumni

Genichiro Tenryu
Kengo Mashimo
Kuuga
Mitsunobu Kikuzawa
Nosawa Rongai
Ryuichi Kawakami
Taru

Championships and accomplishments

Current championships
, Tenryu Project has three recognized championships, all revived from WAR.

Tournaments

Notable shows

First Show
The first show ever held under the "Tenryu Project" banner took place on April 19, 2010 in the Shinjuku Face arena in Tokyo, Japan.

Genichiro Tenryu Retirement ~ Revolution Final Tour
Genichiro Tenryu started his retirement tour with a show at the Shin-Kiba 1st Ring arena on March 6, 2015.

Genichiro Tenryu Retirement ~ Revolution Final Tour in Shinjuku
This event took place on April 3, 2015.

Genichiro Tenryu Retirement ~ Revolution Final Tour in Korakuen
This event took place at the Korakuen Hall on September 2, 2015.

Genichiro Tenryu Retirement ~ Revolution Final
November 15, 2015 at Ryōgoku Kokugikan, Tokyo. Last card of the promotion before the 2020 revival.

See also
WAR
Super World of Sports

References

External links
 Tenryu Project 
 Tenryu Project in Youtube (New)
 Tenryu Project in Youtube (Old)

Japanese professional wrestling promotions
2010 establishments in Japan
Tenryu Project